Shriyut Sriniwas Tiwari (17 September 1926 – 19 January 2018) was a politician from Rewa, Madhya Pradesh, India. He had a long career in Madhya Pradesh state politics. He was a six-time member of the Madhya Pradesh Legislative Assembly. For most of his political career, he was a member of the Indian National Congress, and had stints in Socialist Party and Samyukta Socialist Party in his younger days.

He also served as a member of the Vindhya Pradesh Legislative Assembly between 1952 and 1956, before it was merged into Madhya Pradesh. He was bitterly opposed to the merger and advocated the separation of Vindhya Pradesh region from Madhya Pradesh during his political career. He was known as the White Tiger of Madhya Pradesh.

He lost the election from Sirmour in the 2008 Madhya Pradesh Legislative Assembly election.

Personal life
Sriniwas Tiwari was born on 17 September 1926 in Shahpur, a village in the Kingdom of Rewa, to Mangaldeen Tiwari and Kaushalya Devi. He was a native of Tiuni, a village in Rewa district. Tiwari was a freedom fighter and a lawyer who graduated with a Master of Arts degree in Hindi and an LL.B. from Durbar College, Rewa.

On 21 May 1937, he was wedded to Shravan Kumari, the daughter of Ramniranjan Mishra of Jhiria village in Satna district. He had two sons, Arun Tiwari and Sundar Lal Tiwari. Sundar Lal Tiwari was also an Indian National Congress politician who served as MP and MLA in the Madhya Pradesh Legislative Assembly.

Tiwari died on 19 January 2018, aged 91.

References

External links
Presentation of Mace

1926 births
2018 deaths
People from Madhya Pradesh
Madhya Pradesh politicians
Vindhya Pradesh politicians
People from Rewa district
Vindhya Pradesh MLAs 1951–1956
Madhya Pradesh MLAs 1972–1977
Madhya Pradesh MLAs 1977–1980
Madhya Pradesh MLAs 1980–1985
Madhya Pradesh MLAs 1990–1992
Madhya Pradesh MLAs 1993–1998
Madhya Pradesh MLAs 1998–2003
Speakers of the Madhya Pradesh Legislative Assembly
Deputy Speakers of the Madhya Pradesh Legislative Assembly
Samyukta Socialist Party politicians